Suki de, Suki de, Suki de./Anata dake ga (好きで、好きで、好きで。/あなただけが / Love, Love, Love./Only you) is a single by Japanese R&B/pop singer Koda Kumi. It is a concept single, featuring three different ballads with three different music videos. The B-side of the single, walk ~to the future~, is a re-arrangement of walk from Kumi's 2002 debut album, affection.

The single has been certified gold by the RIAJ for a shipment of 100,000 copies. Suki de, Suki de, Suki de. was certified double platinum for downloads and Anata Dake ga was certified platinum.

Promotional Advertisements
Suki de, Suki de, Suki de. was the commercial song for Kracie's Ichikami (いち髪) shampoo range, which featured Koda Kumi as the spokesperson for the surrounding marketing campaign.

Anata dake ga was used as the NHK drama Second Virgin's theme song.

Music videos
Three music videos were shot for the release and formed together to create a continuous thematic story. Koda Kumi's younger sister, misono, appeared in two of the videos.

Track listing

Chart rankings 
All figures pertain to Suki de, Suki de, Suki de. or the single as a whole, unless stated.

Reported sales and certifications

Release history

Alternate Versions
Suki de, suki de, suki de.
Suki de, suki de, suki de.: Found on the single (2010) and corresponding album Dejavu (2011)
Suki de, suki de, suki de. [AILI's Warmy Remix]: Found on Koda Kumi Driving Hit's 4 (2012)

Anata dake ga
Anata dake ga: Found on the single (2010) and corresponding album Dejavu (2011)
Anata dake ga [Strings Version]: Found on 愛を止めないで (2011)
Anata dake ga [Music Box Version]: Found on 愛を止めないで (2011)
Anata dake ga [World Sketch Remix]: Found on Koda Kumi Driving Hit's 3

References 

2010 singles
2010 songs
Japanese television drama theme songs
Japanese-language songs
Koda Kumi songs
Rhythm Zone singles
RIAJ Digital Track Chart number-one singles
Songs written by Katsuhiko Sugiyama